Pendlebury is part of Greater Manchester in England. Pendlebury may also refer to:

People
Andrew Pendlebury, Australian musician, son of L. Scott Pendlebury
John Pendlebury (1904–41), British archaeologist and soldier
Gwladys Pendlebury, fictional character in the Jeeves and Wooster novels of PG Wodehouse
L. Scott Pendlebury (1914–86), Australian painter and art teacher
Scott Pendlebury, Australian rules footballer
Jonathan Pendlebury, English rugby union player
Anne Scott-Pendlebury, Australia actress, daughter of L. Scott Pendlebury
Oliver Pendlebury, English footballer

Places
Pendlebury, former mining town, now a district in Salford, Greater Manchester
Pendlebury railway station, railway station in the town of Pendlebury
Pendlebury (ward), electoral ward within Pendlebury
Swinton and Pendlebury, former parish and municipal borough of Lancashire